The Beach Volleyball tournament of the 2009 Lusophone Games was played in Lisbon, Portugal. The venue was the Praia de Santo Amaro de Oeiras. The tournament was played from July 16 to 19 July 2009, and there are both men's and women's competition.

Beach Volleyball medal table by country

Male Competition

Female Competition

Top half

Bottom half

Repechage

Final Round

See also
 Lusophony Games
 2009 Lusophony Games

B
Beach volleyball at the Lusofonia Games
2009 in beach volleyball